Sphaenorhynchus carneus, the Napo lime treefrog, is a species of frog in the family Hylidae. It is found in the upper Amazon Basin in southern Colombia, Ecuador, Peru and in central Amazonia in Brazil. It might also occur in Bolivia.

Sphaenorhynchus carneus is a semi-aquatic species found in permanent and semi permanent ponds in open areas, in ponds in primary forest, and on floating mats of vegetation in large rivers. It is reasonably common species which might locally suffer from habitat loss. It is present in many protected areas.

References

carneus
Amphibians of Brazil
Amphibians of Colombia
Amphibians of Ecuador
Amphibians of Peru
Amphibians described in 1868
Taxa named by Edward Drinker Cope
Taxonomy articles created by Polbot